Tamworth is a constituency represented in the House of Commons of the UK Parliament. It has been represented by Chris Pincher since 2010. A former member of the Conservative party, he had the whip removed in July 2022, and sits as an Independent.

Boundaries 

1885–1918: The Municipal Borough of Birmingham, the Sessional Divisions of Birmingham and Solihull, part of the Sessional Divisions of Atherstone and Coleshill, and part of the Municipal Borough of Tamworth.

1918–1945: The Municipal Borough of Sutton Coldfield, the Rural Districts of Meriden and Solihull, and part of the Rural District of Tamworth.

1997–2010: The Borough of Tamworth, and the District of Lichfield wards of Bourne Vale, Fazeley, Little Aston, Mease Valley, Shenstone, Stonnall, and Tame.

2010–present: The Borough of Tamworth, and the District of Lichfield wards of Bourne Vale, Fazeley, Little Aston, Mease and Tame, Shenstone, and Stonnall.

History 
The present Tamworth Constituency replaced the old South East Staffordshire constituency for the 1997 general election.

A previous Tamworth constituency existed from 1563 until it was abolished for the 1945 general election.  It elected two MPs until the 1885 general election, when its representation was reduced to one MP by the Redistribution of Seats Act 1885.

Political history
Since its 1997 recreation the seat has been a bellwether, reflecting the largest party in terms of seats in the House of Commons with the largest share of the vote for the candidate locally. However, the seat has heavily trended towards the Conservatives in the most recent general elections, with majorities in excess of 10,000 in both 2015 and 2017 and almost 20,000 in 2019.

Prominent members
The Prime Minister and leader of the breakaway Tory group, the Peelites, Sir Robert Peel, represented the area for a long period 1830–1850, as did his father, brother and son at different periods. His father and son, also named Robert, also shared the baronetcy gained by his father, which gave them the automatic right to the style "Sir".

Constituency profile
The constituency is convenient for all of the West Midlands conurbation and has considerable local employment.  Workless claimants, registered jobseekers, were in November 2012 lower than the national average of 3.8%, at 2.9% of the population based on a statistical compilation by The Guardian.

Members of Parliament

MPs before 1660

MPs 1660–1885

1885–1945
Tamworth was reduced to having one member in 1885.

The seat was abolished in 1945.

MPs 1997–present

Elections

Elections in the 2010s

Elections in the 2000s

Elections in the 1990s

Elections 1918–1945

Elections in the 1930s
Another general election was required to take place before the end of 1940. The political parties had been making preparations for an election to take place from 1939 and by the end of this year, the following candidates had been selected:
Conservative: John Mellor
Labour: Michael Patrick Fogarty

Elections in the 1920s

Elections in the 1910s

Elections 1885–1918

Elections in the 1910s 

General Election 1914–15:

Another General Election was required to take place before the end of 1915. The political parties had been making preparations for an election to take place and by July 1914, the following candidates had been selected:
Unionist: Francis Newdegate
Liberal:

Elections in the 1900s

Elections in the 1890s

Elections in the 1880s

Elections 1868–1885

Elections in the 1880s

Elections in the 1870s

 

 Caused by Hanbury's resignation in order to contest the 1878 North Staffordshire by-election.

 

 

 

 Caused by John Peel's death.

 Caused by Butler's elevation to the peerage, becoming Lord Dalling and Bulwer.

Elections in the 1860s

Elections 1832–1868

Elections in the 1860s

 

 

Caused by Townshend's succession to the peerage, becoming 5th Marquess Townshend.

 Caused by Peel's appointment as Chief Secretary to the Lord Lieutenant of Ireland.

Elections in the 1850s

 

 Caused by Townshend's elevation to the peerage, becoming Marquess of Townshend

 Caused by Peel's appointment as a Civil Lord of the Admiralty.

 Caused by Robert Peel's death.

Elections in the 1840s

 Caused by William Yates Peel's resignation by accepting the office of Steward of the Chiltern Hundreds

 Caused by Peel's appointment as Prime Minister of the United Kingdom and First Lord of the Treasury

Elections in the 1830s

See also 
List of parliamentary constituencies in Staffordshire

Notes

References

Parliamentary constituencies in Staffordshire
Constituencies of the Parliament of the United Kingdom established in 1563
Politics of Tamworth, Staffordshire
Constituencies of the Parliament of the United Kingdom disestablished in 1945
Constituencies of the Parliament of the United Kingdom established in 1997
Constituencies of the Parliament of the United Kingdom represented by a sitting Prime Minister